The year 1956 in television involved some significant events.
Below is a list of television-related events during 1956.

Events
January 1 – Beleteleradio begins transmissions as the first television channel in Belarus.
January 25–February 5 – The 1956 Winter Olympics in Italy are the first to be broadcast to an international audience. The Soviet Union uses its technological influence to broadcast the Cortina Winter Games to a western audience from a communist point of view.
January 28 – Elvis Presley makes his national television debut on CBS in the United States on the program Stage Show, the first of six appearances on the series.
January 30 - NBC swaps its Cleveland radio and TV stations to Westinghouse Broadcasting in exchange for Westinghouse's own Philadelphia radio and TV stations. The trade was eventually reversed in 1965.
February 14 – Television broadcasting begins in Azerbaijan (AzTV), at this time the Azerbaijan Soviet Socialist Republic.
February 17 – The English Midlands becomes the first part of the United Kingdom outside London to receive Independent Television (ITV), when the Associated Television Network (as ATV Midlands) begins broadcasting their weekday franchise. The weekend franchise, ABC Weekend TV, begins operation a day later.
February – U.M. & M. TV Corporation acquires the pre-October 1950 Paramount Pictures cartoons and theatrical shorts, except for the Popeye and Superman cartoons.
March 21 – TES-TV begins regular broadcasting as the first television channel in Finland.
April 2 – As the World Turns and The Edge of Night premiere on CBS as the first half-hour American soap operas. Previously, all soap operas have been just fifteen minutes in length.
April 3 – Elvis Presley appears on The Milton Berle Show in the United States.
April – WNBQ (modern-day WMAQ-TV) in Chicago becomes the first TV station to broadcast all its local programming in color.
April 14 – Ampex company demonstrates a videotape recorder at the 1956 NARTB (now National Association of Broadcasters) convention in Chicago, Illinois, using the first practical and commercially successful videotape format known as 2" Quadruplex. The three networks place orders for the recorders.
April – United States Senator Estes Kefauver holds congressional hearings on the rising rates of juvenile crime and publishes an article in Reader's Digest named "Let's Get Rid of Tele-Violence."
May 2 – Baghdad Television (BTV) went on the air as the very first television station in Iraq.
May 3 – Granada Television begins broadcasting, extending ITV's coverage to Northern England. ABC Weekend TV's weekend franchise begins operation two days later.
May 6 – Elvis Presley again appears on The Milton Berle Show.
May 12 – HLKZ-TV began transmissions in South Korea.
May 24 – The first Eurovision Song Contest is held in Lugano, Switzerland. It is primarily a radio program at this stage, as few Europeans can afford TV sets.
June 5 – Elvis Presley performs "Hound Dog" on The Milton Berle Show, scandalizing the audience with his suggestive hip movements.
July 1 – Elvis Presley appears on The Steve Allen Show.
July - HSV 7 Melbourne, Australia began test transmissions.
August 5 – KUAM-TV became the first television station in Guam.
August 6 – Final telecast of the DuMont Television Network. The United States will not have a fourth major network until the launch of the Fox network in 1986.
September – NBC introduces a still version of its peacock color logo.
September 4 – Television broadcasting begins in Sweden as Radiotjänst TV went on the air.
September 9 – Elvis Presley appears on The Ed Sullivan Show in the United States for the first time.
September 15 – Gabriel J. Fontana wins a record US$64,000 from the Super Bonus Stunt on Beat the Clock.
September 16 – TCN-9 Sydney becomes the first Australian television station to begin regular transmission.
October 1 – Ernie Kovacs becomes the host for NBC's The Tonight Show in the United States on Mondays and Tuesdays.
October 8 – New York Yankees pitcher Don Larsen throws the first (and to date only) perfect game in World Series history. Mel Allen (representing the Yankees) and Vin Scully (representing the Brooklyn Dodgers) call the game for NBC.
October 28 - La 1, the first TV channel for Television Espanola (TVE), signs on in Madrid, Spain. It is the country's first TV station.  
 October 29
First use of videotape in network television programming; CBS uses its Ampex VTR to record the evening news, anchored by Douglas Edwards. The tape is then fed to West Coast stations three hours later.
Chet Huntley and David Brinkley take over anchor duties of the NBC evening newscast in the United States, which is renamed The Huntley-Brinkley Report.
November 3 – The 1939 MGM movie The Wizard of Oz is shown on television for the first time in the United States, by CBS (the viewing audience is estimated at 45 million people).
November 4 - HSV 7 officially inaugurates on the air in Melbourne, Australia, soon after the Australia Commonwealth Government started issuing television licences. 
November 5 – The Australian Broadcasting Corporation makes its first television broadcast from its Sydney studios. It is inaugurated by Prime Minister Robert Menzies.
November 19 – The Australian Broadcasting Corporation begins broadcast in Melbourne. Along with its Sydney counterpart, they air the 1956 Summer Olympics.
November – The first use of videotape for a network television entertainment program. Jonathan Winters uses videotape and superimposing techniques to be able to play two characters in the same skit for his NBC television show.
December 26 – Algeria's TV1 broadcasts for the very first time as RTF Television Algiers, making it the very first television network in Algeria.
December 31 – Game series host Bob Barker makes his national television debut in the United States on the program Truth or Consequences.
Black-and-white portable TV sets are first marketed.

Programs/programmes
Adventures of Superman (1952–1958)
Alfred Hitchcock Presents (1955–1962)
American Bandstand (1952–1989)
Annie Oakley (1954–1957)
Bozo the Clown (1949–present)
Candid Camera (1948–present)
Captain Kangaroo (1955–1984)
Cheyenne (1955–1962)
Climax! (1954–1958)
Come Dancing (UK) (1949–1995)
Disneyland (1954–1958)
Dixon of Dock Green (UK) (1955–1976)
Dragnet (1951–1959)
Face the Nation (1954–present)
General Motors Theatre (Can) (1953–1956, 1958–1961)
Gillette Cavalcade of Sports (1946–1960)
Gunsmoke (1955–1975)
Hallmark Hall of Fame (1951–present)
Howdy Doody (1947–1960)
I Love Lucy (1951–1960)
Kraft Television Theater (1947–1958)
Kukla, Fran and Ollie (1947–1957)
Life is Worth Living (1952–1957)
Love of Life (1951–1980)
Meet the Press (1947–present)
Mickey Mouse Club (1955–1959)
Our Miss Brooks  (1952-1956)
Ozark Jubilee (1955–1960)
Panorama (UK) (1953–present)
Search for Tomorrow (1951–1986)
Sergeant Preston of the Yukon (1955-1958)
The Adventures of Ozzie and Harriet (1952–1966)
The Brighter Day (1954–1962)
The Ed Sullivan Show (1948–1972)
The George Burns and Gracie Allen Show (1950–1958)
The Good Old Days (UK) (1953–1983)
The Grove Family (UK) (1954–1957)
The Guiding Light (1952–2009)
The Jack Benny Program (1950–1965)
The Lawrence Welk Show (1955–1982)
The Milton Berle Show (1954–1967)
The Roy Rogers Show (1951–1957)
The Secret Storm (1954–1974)
The Today Show (1952–present)
The Tonight Show (1954–present)
The Voice of Firestone (1949–1963)
This Is Your Life (UK) (1955–1964, 1969–2003)
This Is Your Life (US) (1952–1961)
Truth or Consequences (1950–1988)
What's My Line (1950–1967)
Your Hit Parade (1950–1959)
Zoo Quest (UK) (1954–1964)

Debuts
January 3 – Queen for a Day (1956–1964)
February 10 – My Friend Flicka (1956–1958)
April 2 
As the World Turns (1956–2010)
The Edge of Night (1956–1984)
April 26 – The Eddy Arnold Show on ABC
July 6 – Hancock's Half Hour, broadcast by BBC Television (1956–1962)
July 7 – High Finance, hosted by Dennis James, on CBS (1956)
July 8 – The drama series Armchair Theatre, produced by ABC Weekend TV for the ITV network, begins its long run in the UK (1956–1968)
July 13 – It's Polka Time on ABC (1956–1957)
September 7 – The Adventures of Jim Bowie on ABC (1956–1958)
September 8 – Hey, Jeannie! starring Jeannie Carson on CBS (1956–57, then 1958 in syndication as The Jeannie Carson Show)
September 15 – The Adventures of Sir Lancelot (UK) on ITV (After being sold to the NBC network in the United States, it later becomes the first British television series ever to be made in colour, in this case it wouldn't premiere in the United States until 9 days later on September 24, 1956) (1956–57)
September 18 – Noah's Ark, featuring Paul Burke debuts on NBC (1956–1957)
September 25 – State Trooper featuring Rod Cameron premieres in syndication (1956–1959)
September 29 – The Gale Storm Show premieres on CBS (1956–1960)
October 4 – In the USA
Playhouse 90 (1956–1961)
The Ford Show, "Starring Tennessee Ernie Ford" (1956–1961)
October 27 – Accent on Strings (1956, Sydney Australia, debuts on the first "official" day of television in Australia)
October 29 – Fun Farm (1956–1957, first Australian-produced children's television series)
November 9
The Isador Goodman Show (1956–1957, Melbourne Australia)
Stairway to the Stars (1956–1958, Melbourne Australia)
November 11 – Air Power, narrated by Walter Cronkite, on CBS (1956–1957)
November 15 – TV Channell (1956–1957, Sydney and Melbourne Australia)
November 26 – The Price Is Right game series premieres (1956–1965).
December 3 – Sydney Tonight (1956–1959, Sydney Australia)
Opportunity Knocks on ITV (UK) (1956–1978)
The Steve Allen Show premieres in the US (1956–1960)
What the Papers Say on ITV (UK) (1956–2008)

Ending this year

Births

References